Swift Engineering Inc. is an American spacecraft engineering firm that builds autonomous systems, helicopters, submarines, spacecraft, ground vehicles, robotics, and composite parts. Swift used to produce racing cars for open-wheel racing series, including Formula Ford, Formula Atlantic, the Champ Car World Series and Formula Nippon, having designed and fabricated over 500 race cars.

History
Swift Engineering was founded as SWIFT CARS in 1983 by David Bruns, Alex Cross, R. K. Smith, and Paul White. Their first car, the DB-1, was a Formula Ford which won the SCCA National Championship in its debut race. The company later built cars for Sports 2000, Formula Ford 2000, Formula Atlantic, and CART. Swift chassis won the Atlantic Championship from 1989 to 1992 and British Formula Renault in 1990.

In 1991, Swift was purchased by Panasonic executive and former Indycar racing driver Hiro Matsushita, grandson of Panasonic founder Konosuke Matsushita, who renamed the firm Swift Engineering. Under his direction, Swift moved up to the CART World Series for 1997, with two cars entered by Newman/Haas Racing and driven by Michael Andretti and Christian Fittipaldi. In CART, Swifts got four wins and 24 podiums from 182 race entries. Tarso Marques was the last driver to race a Swift chassis in CART in the 2000 season.

From 2000 Swift Engineering started to provide vertically integrated, multidisciplined, product development services including design, development, engineering, testing, and rapid manufacturing of prototypes, demonstrators, and pre-production articles.

In 2018, Swift Engineering started its overseas office forming, a joint venture with Kobe Institute of Computing called Swift-Xi Inc in Kobe, Japan providing data, logistics, and operations of autonomous and robotic technologies.

Racing cars
The first Swift racecar was the DB-1 Formula Ford.  The car won its debus race, the 1983 SCCA Runoffs at Road Atlanta.  The DB-1 was the third car designed by Bruns and was considered to be a design simplification of Burns's previous design, the Automotive Development ADF.  The car was considered a landmark design that rendered prior Formula Ford models obsolete.  The DB-1 had the lowest aerodynamic drag of any Formula Ford at the time of its release.  Over 100 DB-1s were sold in the 18 months following the car's release. The car won 10 Formula Ford championships over the next 13 years.  The closely related DB6 won an additional six championships with the last one in 2008.  The success of the car was considered one of the factors that resulted in a slow decline of Formula Ford in the US after 1984.

In 1998, Swift became the sole supplier for the new spec regulation Toyota Atlantic Championship. In 2006, the Atlantic race series became a part of the Champ Car (formerly CART) organization and was renamed the Champ Car Atlantic Championship Powered by Mazda. Swift built an entirely new car for the series, using 016.a as a chassis code. Swift became the sole supplier of chassis for the Japanese Formula Nippon championship in 2009 with the 017.n chassis (also known as the FN09). An updated model called SF13 was used in 2013. A derivative of the 017.n, the 020.I, was proposed by the company in response to Indy Lights' requirement for a new chassis for the 2014 season.

Aviation
Beginning in 1997, Swift diversified into aerospace/aviation markets, working with major companies including Northrop Grumman, Boeing, Lockheed Martin, SpaceX, Sikorsky, and others. Swift has also worked for govermential agencies such as NASA.

Killer Bee
Swift Engineering designed, built, and delivered the runway-independent Killer Bee blended wing UAV and its mobile launch/retrieval system in 2002. Northrop Grumman bought the Killer Bee UAV product line from Swift Engineering, and renamed it as the Northrop Grumman Bat in April 2009. It has been used primarily as an ISR gathering tool, and features a 10-ft wingspan with 30-lb payload capacity.

Eclipse 400
In 2007 Swift Engineering produced the prototype Eclipse 400 single-engine jet aircraft under contract to Eclipse Aviation. The aircraft was built in secrecy at NASA's Wallops Flight Facility in Virginia and first flown on 2 July 2007. Swift supplies high-strength, low-weight composite parts and assemblies to a number of aerospace industry customers. Engineering consultancy and the design and production of tooling for composite parts are further aspects of the business.

Sikorsky–Boeing SB-1 Defiant
Swift Engineering Inc. joined the Sikorsky-Boeing team in 2015 to support the development of the Sikorsky–Boeing SB-1 Defiant Multi-Role Technology Demonstrator (JMR TD), with design and manufacturing of a significant portion of the airframe structure.

Swift020/021
In 2014 Swift started developing the Swift020 fully electric, fully autonomous VTOL UAS. This aircraft is runway independent and transitions to horizontal flight through its autopilot software. the first UAS featuring X-blade technology, made its first fully autonomous flight demonstration in the city of Kobe, Japan on July 21, 2018. It takes off and lands like a quadrotor but transitions to efficient fixed-wing forward flight without additional launch and recovery equipment, vastly reducing operational time and cost. It has a 4-meter wingspan, 2–3 hours of endurance, and a 1.5-kg payload.

Swift Ultra Long Endurance (SULE)
In 2018 Swift proposed to design, fabricate, and fly a Swift Ultra Long Endurance (SULE) 30-day mission high-altitude long endurance (HALE) UAS with flight tests including 24-hrs, 48-hrs, and 7-days during the Phase 2 timeline for NASA. All operations, ground control, safety, reviews, and payload will be included in these test flights and within the proposed 2-year timeframe. Swift HALE completed its first test flight from Spaceport America in New Mexico in 2020.

Naval technology

XLUUV submarine
In 2017 Swift Engineering designed, fabricated, and delivered QTY 10, 10-ft Iridium NEXT payload adapter cylinders, structures for a 50 ft. XLUUV unmanned submarine.

Recognitions
Swift Engineering has been nominated and recognized multiple times in the past few years for its program management techniques and its quality management techniques due to the extensive programs Swift has been involved with.
2012: Swift Engineering received the JEC Americas Innovation Award for its out of autoclave process
2012: Northrop Grumman Small Business Supplier of the Year, awarded from 1500 suppliers
2013: Swift Engineering has been chosen as a "Best in Class" A&D Company to Watch by Aviation Week
2015: Boeing Supplier of the Year nomination in 2015
2017: Swift Engineering was awarded "Best Intrapreneurship" by OCTANe, Orange County's technology, and life sciences accelerator organization, during the annual High Tech Innovations event held Oct. 13, 2017, in Newport Beach, CA.
2018: Swift proposed to design, fabricate, and fly a Swift Ultra Long Endurance (SULE) 30-day mission HALE UAS with flight tests including 24-hrs, 48-hrs, and 7-days during the Phase 2 timeline for NASA. All operations, ground control, safety, reviews, and payload will be included in these test flights and within the proposed 2-year timeframe.
2019: Swift Engineering has been selected out of 25 companies around the world to install a UAS academy for the Ministry of National Security (Bahamas), to deploy a suite of drones to support the country's command, control, communication, and ISR efforts.
2019: Swift is delivering a pair of low-cost (90% reduction), low weight (50% reduction) telepresence robotic arm replacements to NASA for their Valkyrie humanoid robotic assembly.
2019: Swift Engineering has been selected for the design and construction of Future Attack Reconnaissance Aircraft (FARA) Airframe for Sikorsky.

References

External links

 Swift Engineering web site
 JUSTIA
 Road and Track road test of the Swift DB-1 Formula Ford
 NASA
 The Bridge
 Forbes Japan
 
 

Formula Atlantic
Sports car manufacturers
Aircraft manufacturers of the United States
Aerospace companies
American racecar constructors
Champ Car
Aerospace companies of the United States
Engineering companies of the United States
Unmanned aerial vehicle manufacturers
Defense companies of the United States
American companies established in 1983